Pachnephorus medvedevi is a species of leaf beetle found in Zambia and the Democratic Republic of the Congo, described by Stefano Zoia in 2007. It is named after Lev Medvedev, a specialist in Chrysomelidae and a friend of the author.

References

Eumolpinae
Beetles of the Democratic Republic of the Congo
Insects of Zambia
Beetles described in 2007